Mounie Castle stands in its grounds in the village of Daviot, Aberdeenshire, Scotland. It is a Category A listed building. It was built by Robert Farquhar, lord provost of Aberdeen, between 1641 and 1644.

In 1701 it was owned by Alex Hay of Arnbath. George Seton lived there in 1714. He was a descendent of the Setons of Meldrum, the original owners.

See also
List of Category A listed buildings in Aberdeenshire

References

External links
Mounie Castle – thesetonfamily.com

Castles in Aberdeenshire
Category A listed buildings in Aberdeenshire
Listed castles in Scotland
17th-century establishments in Scotland